Jun Won-tchack (born January 8, 1955) is a South Korean lawyer, writer and broadcaster. He is well known for holding right-wing political views.
He was born in Ulsan, South Korea. He served in the military as a lawyer and was discharged as a colonel.

Education 
1966 Graduated from Daehyun elementary school in Ulsan
1969 Graduated from Busan middle school
1972 Graduated from Busan high school
1979 Graduated from the Kyung Hee University college of law

See also

References

External links 
  
 Kyung Hee University College of Law home page 

20th-century South Korean lawyers
1955 births
Living people
People from Ulsan
South Korean writers
Kyung Hee University alumni
21st-century South Korean lawyers